Bytomsko  is a village and sołectwo in the administrative district of Gmina Żegocina, within Bochnia County, Lesser Poland Voivodeship, in southern Poland.

References

Bytomsko